Casper is a surname. Notable people with the surname include:

Anne Casper (born 1965), American diplomat and ambassador
Billy Casper (1931–2015), American golfer
Chris Casper (born 1975), English former footballer and football manager 
Dave Casper (born 1951), American professional football player
Drew Casper, American film historian and theorist
Duncan Spears Casper, (1824–1898), early Mormon pioneer and one of the first settlers of Holladay, Utah.
Gerhard Casper (born 1937), ninth president of Stanford University
John Casper (born 1943), astronaut and U.S. Air Force colonel
Siegfried Jost Casper (born 1929), German biologist

See also
Donald Caspar (born 1927), American scientist
Joseph Caspar (1799-1847), Swiss painter
Michaela Caspar (born 1960), German actress
Casper (disambiguation)

Surnames from given names